This page lists notable Korean painters beginning from the Joseon Dynasty, including any born in Korea or identifying themselves as Korean.

Joseon period

20th century

Contemporary painters

See also

Korean painting
Korean art

Notes

References
 Information about Korean famous painters at empas/EncyKorea

Painters
 Painters
Korea